is a Japanese short track speed skater. She competed in the women's 3000 metre relay event at the 2002 Winter Olympics.

References

1977 births
Living people
Japanese female short track speed skaters
Olympic short track speed skaters of Japan
Short track speed skaters at the 2002 Winter Olympics
Sportspeople from Osaka Prefecture
Asian Games medalists in short track speed skating
Short track speed skaters at the 1999 Asian Winter Games
Medalists at the 1999 Asian Winter Games
Asian Games silver medalists for Japan
20th-century Japanese women